The 1912–13 season was Woolwich Arsenal's ninth consecutive campaign in the first division of English football, but it would prove to be their last for nearly six years, as the club was relegated for the first and only time in their history. 
The Reds finished 20th, winning just three times in the league and four times in total, going out to Liverpool 4–1 at the Manor Ground in the second hurdle of the FA Cup. The Reds' league goal difference was -48, and their top goalscorer in the league, Charles Randall, managed just four goals in 38 games. 
The season began with a win, a draw and three losses in the opening five matches, before Woolwich Arsenal embarked upon a run of 22 games without a league win, and in 25 games in all competitions just one match was won, against Croydon Common in the FA Cup first round. Two league wins in a row-against Manchester City and West Bromwich Albion followed, before the Reds' relegation was confirmed on the penultimate day of the season, with Woolwich drawing with Tottenham Hotspur whilst Chelsea defeated Middlesbrough, meaning they fell eight points behind with a game to go.

Results
Arsenal's score comes first

Football League First Division

Final League table

FA Cup

References

1912-13
English football clubs 1912–13 season